Sudan Independent School District is a public school district based in Sudan, Texas (USA).  The district includes portions of three counties – Lamb, Bailey, and Cochran.  Sudan ISD has two campuses - Sudan High (Grades 8-12) and Sudan Elementary (Grades K-7).  In 2009, the school district was rated "recognized" by the Texas Education Agency.

On July 1, 2002 Three Way Independent School District consolidated into Sudan ISD.

References

External links
Sudan ISD

School districts in Lamb County, Texas
School districts in Bailey County, Texas
School districts in Cochran County, Texas